Centenary in British English, is a 100th anniversary or otherwise relates to a century, a period of 100 years

Centenary may also refer to:

Places

United States 
 Centenary, Indiana, an unincorporated community
 Centenary, South Carolina, an unincorporated community
 Centenary, Virginia, an unincorporated community

Elsewhere 
 Centenary Suburbs, a group of suburbs of Brisbane, Queensland, Australia
 Centenary, Zimbabwe, a village in Mashonaland Central Province, Zimbabwe

Schools
 Centenary College of Louisiana, a private college in Shreveport, Louisiana, United States
 Centenary State High School, a high school in Brisbane, Queensland, Australia
 Centenary University, a private university in Hackettstown, New Jersey, United States

Other
 Centenary (concert), a television event produced to mark the 100-year anniversary of Ireland's 1916 Easter Rising

See also
 Centenarian, a person who has reached the age of 100 years
 Centenario (disambiguation)
 Centennial (disambiguation)
 Century (disambiguation)